Bowers is a village in Staffordshire, England. For population details as taken in the 2011 census see Standon.

Villages in Staffordshire